Antonio Rossetti or Rosetti (1819–1889) was an Italian sculptor of nudes and figures.

Life 
Antonio Rossetti was born in Milan on 31 October 1819. He studied first in Milan with Francesco Somaini, and from 1844 in Rome.

Rossetti moved to Rome in 1843, and worked there until the end of his life. He was a hard and meticulous worker who created numerous sculptures in line with contemporary tastes, which he sold to the rich, earning him a considerable fortune. His sensual marble figures and groups were especially popular with foreign visitors.

He died in Rome in 1889, although at least one source gives the earlier date of September 1876.

Works 

In 1849, Rossetti painted the bust of Volta for the ascent to the Pincian Hill. He created genre statuettes, nudes, portraits and funerary monuments.

Exhibitions 
He exhibited in Rome in 1879: Ritratto di D. Marino Torlonia ('Portrait of D. Marino Torlonia'), L'Estate ('Summer'), Psiche ('Psyche'), Amore ('Love'), La tentazione di una Vestale ('The Temptation of a Vestal'), and again in 1887. In 1877 he exhibited in Liverpool, and in 1888 he exhibited in London: Garibaldi, Mercante d'amore ('Merchant of Love'), Ingenua ('Ingénue'), Ofelia ('Ophelia'), and Amore segreto ('Secret Love').

Collections 

 Hermitage Museum: Esmeralda (1856);
 Glasgow Museums: The Nubian Slave (after 1858, marble);
 McLean Museum and Art Gallery: The Flight from Pompeii (1878, marble).

Notes

References 

 Martoreli, Roberto and Panzetta, Alfonso (2015). "Antonio Rossetti". Storia e Memoria di Bologna. Istituzione Bologna Musei.
 Oliver, Valerie Cassel, ed. (2011). "Rosetti, Antonio". In Benezit Dictionary of Artists. Oxford University Press.
 Rainer, Ch. (1986). "Rossetti, Antonio". In Österreichisches Biographisches Lexikon 1815–1950. Vol. 9. Austrian Academy of Sciences. p. 263.

1819 births
1889 deaths
19th-century Italian sculptors